Mystic Rock is a private golf course at Nemacolin Resort in Farmington, Pennsylvania.

Golf Digest named it #75 "America’s 100 Greatest Public Courses"; #14 "Public Course in Pennsylvania"; and #22 "American’s Top 50 Courses for Women." Golfweek named it #55 "America’s 100 Best Resort Golf Courses"; #1 "Public Course in Pennsylvania"; and #2 "Best Courses You Can Play in Pennsylvania." Golf Range Magazine named it to the list of "Top 50 Public Ranges."

Gallery

References

External links

Golf clubs and courses in Pennsylvania
Fayette County, Pennsylvania